Here Comes the Sun is the third studio album by Australian recording artist Rachael Leahcar. The album was released on 11 April 2014, through Universal Music Australia. The album, a collection of Beatles covers, was announced on March 31, 2014 Leahcar described the album as “really special”.

Background
The idea for the album came about when Leahcar's record label, Universal, asked if she would be interested in doing a concept album. According to Leahcar, the album was "quite last minute" and was completed in just a few weeks. In addition to the songs featured on the album, Leahcar revealed she had also recorded other Beatles songs including, "The Fool on the Hill", "If I Fell", and "Dear Prudence", but they were ultimately cut. "Norwegian Wood" was also cut from the album due to the lyrical content. Leahcar explained, "I didn't think it was really 'me' to sing it"!

Leahcar's version of "Across the Universe" also appears on Then & Now: Australia Salutes The Beatles, a compilation album celebrating 50 years since The Beatles first came to Australia.

Track listing

Release history

References

Rachael Leahcar albums
Universal Music Australia albums
2014 albums
Covers albums